Élodie Vanessa Embony (born 22 October 1987) is a Malagasy athlete competing in sprinting events. She represented her country at the 2016 World Indoor Championships without advancing from the first round.

Competition record

Personal bests
Outdoor
100 metres – 11.76 (-0.1 m/s, St Paul de la Réunion 2015)
200 metres – 24.22 (+0.8 m/s, Brazzaville 2015)
Indoor
60 metres – 7.65 (Portland 2016)

References

1987 births
Living people
Malagasy female sprinters
Athletes (track and field) at the 2015 African Games
African Games competitors for Madagascar